Sven van Beek (born 28 July 1994) is a Dutch professional footballer who plays as a centre-back for Eredivisie club Heerenveen.

Club career

Feyenoord
Born in Gouda, Van Beek began playing football in the youth departments of SV Donk and Sparta Rotterdam, before joining the Feyenoord academy in 2005. He made his full debut on 30 January 2013 against PSV in the KNVB Cup. He replaced Daryl Janmaat who could not play because of illness. In the 83rd minute, head coach Ronald Koeman replaced him for midfielder Ruud Vormer. He made his first start for Feyenoord against archrivals Ajax on 18 August 2013 at the right back position, as they lost 2–1. 

Van Beek scored his first goal in the UEFA Europa League in a match against Standard Liège on 2 October 2014, as Feyenoord won 2–1. Feyenoord would become the group winner in that tournament, partly by winning 2–0 at home against defending title holders Sevilla, after goals from Jens Toornstra and Karim El Ahmadi, and winning 0–3 in the other match against Standard Liège. In the knockout phase, Feyenoord managed a 1–1 draw away against Roma. Feyenoord lost 1–2 at home, after Mitchell te Vrede was sent off. In the 2014–15 season, Van Beek became a regular starter for the club, replacing Stefan de Vrij in the centre-back position, who had left for Lazio. Van Beek was also a regular fixture in the team in the 2015–16 season, with Feyenoord winning the KNVB Cup that season. Van Beek, however, received a lot of criticism, after several defensive mistakes. Feyenoord finished 3rd that season in the Eredivisie. In the 2016–17 pre-season game on 2 July 2016 against RKSV Driel, Van Beek replaced Wessel Dammers at half time, but fell out with an injury shortly after, causing him to miss the entire season. Feyenoord won the Eredivisie title during that season, but Van Beek was unable to contribute to this due to his long-term injury. He celebrated the championship party on crutches.

Van Beek also had to miss the preparation for the 2017–18 season due to the injury. However, he did rejoin the group on the training pitch. On 26 September 2017, Van Beek made his official return in the 3–1 away game in the UEFA Champions League against Napoli. That season, Van Beek would make 28 appearances. Van Beek was also a regular starter during the 2018–19 season, playing on 22 April 2018 as Feyenoord won the KNVB Cup final 3–0 over AZ. On 5 November 2018, he signed a three-year contract extension, keeping him at the club until June 2021. On 17 February 2019, he became the shared record holder for most own goals (6) in Eredivisie history, alongside Daan Schrijvers and Marílio. In the 2019–20 season, Van Beek was demoted to the reserves. During the preparation for the 2020–21 season, he suffered another ankle injury, sidelining him for an extended period of time.

Willem II (loan)
On 1 February 2021, Van Beek was sent on loan to Willem II. He made his debut on 14 February in a 5–0 away loss to the team which he was sent on loan from; Feyenoord. He was in the starting lineup but was substituted for Jordens Peters in the 66th minute. He subsequently remained a starter during the spring season, as Willem II finished one point clear of relegation and finished in 14th place.

Heerenveen
On 19 July 2021, Van Beek signed a two-year contract with Heerenveen. He made his debut on 13 August on the opening day of the domestic competition, contributing to keeping a clean sheet in a 1–0 away win over Go Ahead Eagles.

International career
Van Beek received his first call up to the senior Netherlands team in September 2014.

Career statistics

Honours
Feyenoord
 Eredivisie: 2016–17
 KNVB Cup: 2015–16, 2017–18
Johan Cruijff Shield: 2018

References

External links
 
 Voetbal International profile 

1994 births
Living people
Footballers from Gouda, South Holland
Association football defenders
Dutch footballers
Sparta Rotterdam players
Feyenoord players
Willem II (football club) players
SC Heerenveen players
Eredivisie players
Netherlands youth international footballers
Netherlands under-21 international footballers